This is a list of automobiles manufactured by Beijing Jeep Corporation, a company that now goes under the name Beijing Benz:

BJ212/BJ2020
Jeep BJ2021/7250 Cherokee (based on the Jeep Cherokee (XJ), this was the original vehicle produced by Beijing Jeep from 1983 to 2005)
Jeep 2500/2700
Chrysler Sebring JS
Chrysler 300C
Jeep 4000/4700 (Jeep Grand Cherokee)
BJ2022 Brave Warrior (military vehicle) 
Mitsubishi Pajero Sport
Mitsubishi Outlander

References

Beijing Jeep Corporation